Ought may refer to:
One of the English modal verbs
One of the names for the number 0 in English
Ought (band), a Montreal post-punk band on the Canadian Constellation Records

See also
Is–ought problem
Categorical imperative
Nought